The Bishop of Glendalough was an episcopal title which took its name after the monastery at Glendalough in County Wicklow, Republic of Ireland. An Irish version of the place name, Glenndálocha, is now used for a titular see.

History

The diocese of Glendalough was one of the dioceses established at the Synod of Rathbreasail, held in 1111. After the death of Bishop William Piro and the failed effort to get possession of the see by Bishop-elect Robert de Bedford, the dioceses of Glendalough and Dublin were united in 1214. The union of the two was confirmed by Pope Innocent III on 25 February 1216, and confirmed again by Pope Honorius III on 6 October 1216. During the late fifteenth and early sixteenth centuries, a number of titular bishops were appointed, but none of them had effective possession of the see. After the Reformation in Ireland, the title Bishop of Glendalough was dropped by the Roman Catholic archbishops of Dublin, but is still used by the Church of Ireland archbishops of Dublin.

In 1969, an Irish version of the place name, Glenndálocha, is now used by Roman Catholic Church for a titular see which is currently vacant.

Diocesan bishops of Glendalough

Medieval titular bishops of Glendalough

Modern titular bishops and archbishops of Glenndálocha

References

Glendalough
Religion in County Wicklow
Former Roman Catholic bishoprics in Ireland
History of County Wicklow
Glenndalocha